Advenella faeciporci is a nitrite-denitrifying bacterium from the genus Advenella which was isolated from piggery wastewater.

References

External links	
Type strain of Advenella faeciporci at BacDive -  the Bacterial Diversity Metadatabase

Burkholderiales
Bacteria described in 2012